Harriet Hawkins  (born 1980) is a British cultural geographer. She is Professor of Human Geography at Royal Holloway, University of London, where she is the founder and Co-Director of the Centre for Geo-Humanities (with Veronica Della Dora), and the Director of the Technē AHRC Doctoral Training Partnership. As part of Research Excellence Framework 2021, she is a member of the Geography and Environmental Studies expert sub-panel. In 2016, she was winner of a Philip Leverhulme Prize and the Royal Geographical Society Gill Memorial Award. In 2019, she was awarded a five-year European Research Council grant, as part of the Horizon 2020 research and innovation programme. She was previously the Chair of the Royal Geographical Society Social and Cultural Geography Research Group.

Career

Hawkins' research is focused on the advancement of the geo-humanities, a field that sits at the intersection of geographical scholarship with arts and humanities scholarship and practice. Empirically, she explores the geographies of art works and art worlds.

She was educated at the University of Nottingham, where she completed a Bachelor of Arts degree in geography with first-class honours (winning the School of Geography Prize and the Edwards Prize), a Master of Arts degree in landscape and culture, and a Doctor of Philosophy degree examining the geographies of art and rubbish, funded by the Arts and Humanities Research Council (AHRC), and supervised by Stephen Daniels. After leaving Nottingham, she held AHRC Research Fellowships at the University of Exeter and Aberystwyth University, and was a lecturer at the University of Bristol, before arriving at Royal Holloway, University of London in 2012. She was promoted to professor in 2016.

At Royal Holloway, she is also founder and the Co-Director of the Centre for the Geo-Humanities with Veronica Della Dora.  The centre connects arts and humanities scholars and practitioners, geographers and the creative and cultural sectors. It encourages work with an arts and humanities perspective on issues that have a strong geographical resonance, such as space, place, landscape, and environment. Its over 50 members include: Felix Driver, Robert Hampson, Julian Johnson, and Jo Shapcott.

She serves as the Director of the Technē AHRC Doctoral Training Partnership which awards 60 doctoral studentships per year, across nine academic institutions in London and the South East of England, in partnership with organisations such as Historic Royal Palaces, the Institute of Contemporary Arts, the National Theatre and the Victoria and Albert Museum.

She is also managing editor of the journal Cultural Geographies, and associate editor of GeoHumanities. She was the Chair of the Royal Geographical Society Social and Cultural Geography Research Group, and is currently a Panel Chair for the United Kingdom Research and Innovation Future Leader Fellowships Peer Review College. She was appointed member of the Geography and Environmental Studies expert sub-panel for the 2021 UK Research Excellence Framework assessment.

She has delivered over 60 invited lectures, keynotes and plenaries in 16 countries, and examined over 30 doctoral theses in nine countries. In April 2019, Hawkins delivered the Cultural Geographies Annual Lecture, titled Going Underground: Creating Subterranean Imaginations, at the American Association of Geographers Annual Meeting in Washington, DC. In July 2020, she will be a plenary speaker at The Institute of Australian Geographers annual conference.

In December 2019, it was announced that Hawkins was one of 301 researchers, across all disciplines and from 24 countries, selected from 2,453 applicants for the award of a prestigious five-year European Research Council Consolidator Grant, as part of the Horizon 2020 research and innovation programme, for her project Thinking Deep – Novel creative approaches to the underground, providing funding of up to €2 million.

Honours and awards

 European Research Council Consolidator Grant, Thinking Deep – Novel creative approaches to the underground (2020–2025)
 Cultural Geographies Annual Lecture, Going Underground: Creating Subterranean Imaginations (2019)
 Chair of the Royal Geographical Society Social and Cultural Geography Research Group (2016–2019)
 AHRC Leadership Fellowship (2016–2018)
 Philip Leverhulme Prize (2016)
 Royal Geographical Society Gill Memorial Award (2016)
 Progress in Human Geography prize for the best paper of the year: Geography and Art. An Expanding Field: Site, The Body and Practice (2013)
 Fellow of the Royal Geographical Society (2007)

Selected publications

Since 2009, Hawkins has achieved over 80 peer-reviewed outputs, including:

Books
 Geography, Art, Research: Artistic Research in the GeoHumanities (Routledge 2020), 
 Geographies of Making, Craft and Creativity (Editor with Laura Price) (Routledge 2018), 
 Creativity (Routledge 2016), 
 Geographical Aesthetics: Imagining Space, Staging Encounters (Editor with Elizabeth Straughan) (Ashgate 2015), 
 For Creative Geographies: Geography, Visual Arts and the Making of Worlds (Routledge 2013),

Journal articles
 Underground imaginations, environmental crisis and subterranean cultural geographies. Cultural Geographies (2020)
 (W)holes – Volume, Horizon, Surface – Three intimate geologies. Emotion, Space and Society (2019)
 Geography's creative (re)turn: Toward a critical framework. Progress in Human Geography (2018)
 To talk of turns. Three cross-disciplinary provocations for creative turns. Journal of Contemporary Archaeology (2018)
 Creative geographic methods: knowing, representing, intervening. On composing place and page. Cultural Geographies (2015)
 Geography and art. An expanding field: Site, the body and practice. Progress in Human Geography (2013)
 Dialogues and doings: Sketching the relationships between geography and art. Geography Compass (2011)
 'The argument of the eye'? The cultural geographies of installation art. Cultural Geographies (2010)

References

1980 births
Living people
Academics of Royal Holloway, University of London
Academics of the University of London
Academics of the University of Bristol
Academics of the University of Exeter
Academics of Aberystwyth University
Alumni of the University of Nottingham
People educated at Wellington School, Somerset
People from Honiton
Fellows of the Royal Geographical Society
English geographers
Human geographers
Cultural geographers
Women geographers
21st-century geographers
21st-century English women
English feminists
British women social scientists
British social scientists
Women art historians
English art historians
21st-century English educators
21st-century women educators